Perdigão S.A. is Brazilian food producer founded in 1934 in the state of Santa Catarina in the South of Brazil, in 2009 announced merger with competitor Sadia forming Brasil Foods.

References 

Food and drink companies of Brazil
Companies based in Santa Catarina (state)